Clive Jay Davis (born April 4, 1932) is an American record producer, A&R executive, record executive, and lawyer. He has won five Grammy Awards and was inducted into the Rock and Roll Hall of Fame, as a non-performer, in 2000.

From 1967 to 1973, Davis was the president of Columbia Records. He was founder and president of Arista Records from 1974 through 2000 until founding J Records. From 2002 until April 2008, he was chair and CEO of the RCA Music Group (which included RCA Records, J Records, and Arista Records), chair and CEO of J Records, and chair and CEO of BMG North America.

Davis is credited with hiring a young recording artist, Tony Orlando, for Columbia in 1967. He has signed many artists who achieved significant success, including Sly and the Family Stone, Janis Joplin, Laura Nyro, Santana, Bruce Springsteen, Chicago, Billy Joel, Donovan, Bay City Rollers Blood, Sweat & Tears, Loggins & Messina, Ace of Base, Aerosmith, Olivia Longott, Pink Floyd and Westlife. He is also credited with bringing Whitney Houston and Barry Manilow to prominence.

As of 2018, Davis is the chief creative officer of Sony Music Entertainment.

Early life and education 
Davis was born in Brooklyn, New York City, to a Jewish family, the son of Herman and Florence Davis. His father was an electrician and salesman. Davis was raised in Crown Heights, Brooklyn.

His mother died at age 47, and his father died the following year when Davis was still a teenager. He then moved in with his married sister, who lived in Bayside, Queens, New York City.

He attended New York University College of Arts and Science, where he graduated magna cum laude with a degree in political science and Phi Beta Kappa in 1953. He received a full scholarship to Harvard Law School, where he was a member of the Board of Student Advisers and graduated in 1956.

Career

Columbia/CBS Records years 
Davis practiced law in a small firm in New York, then moved on to the firm of Rosenman, Colin, Kaye, Petschek, and Freund two years later, where partner Ralph Colin had CBS as a client. Davis was subsequently hired by a former colleague at the firm, Harvey Schein, to become assistant counsel of CBS subsidiary Columbia Records at age 28, and then general counsel the following year.

As part of a reorganization of Columbia Records Group, group president Goddard Lieberson appointed Davis as administrative vice president and general manager in 1965. In 1966, CBS formed the Columbia-CBS Group which reorganized CBS's recorded music operations into CBS Records with Davis heading the new unit.

The next year, Davis was appointed president and became interested in the newest generation of folk rock and rock and roll. One of his earliest pop signings was the British folk-rock musician Donovan, who enjoyed a string of successful hit singles and albums released in the U.S. on the Epic Records label.  That same year, Davis hired 23-year-old recording artist Tony Orlando as general manager of Columbia publishing subsidiary April-Blackwood Music; Orlando went on to become vice-president of Columbia/CBS Music and signed Barry Manilow in 1969.

In June 1967, Davis attended the Monterey Pop Festival after his friends and business associate, Lou Adler, convinced him. He immediately signed Janis Joplin with Big Brother and the Holding Company, and Columbia went on to sign Laura Nyro; The Electric Flag; Santana; The Chambers Brothers; Bruce Springsteen; Chicago; Billy Joel; Blood, Sweat & Tears; Loggins & Messina; Aerosmith; and Pink Floyd (for rights to release their material outside of Europe). The company, which had previously avoided rock music (its few rock acts prior to the Davis presidency included Dion DiMucci, The Byrds, Simon & Garfunkel, and Paul Revere and the Raiders), doubled its market share in three years.

One of the most commercially successful recordings released during Davis' tenure at Columbia was Lynn Anderson's Rose Garden, in late 1970. It was Davis who insisted "Rose Garden" be the country singer's next single release. The song crossed over and was a No.1 hit in 16 countries worldwide.  "Rose Garden" remained the biggest-selling album by a female country artist for 27 years.

In 1972, Davis signed Earth, Wind & Fire to Columbia Records. One of his most recognized accomplishments was signing the Boston group Aerosmith to Columbia Records in the early 1970s at New York City's Max's Kansas City. The accomplishment was mentioned in the 1979 Aerosmith song "No Surprize", where Steven Tyler sings, "Old Clive Davis said he's surely gonna make us a star, I'm gonna make you a star, just the way you are." Starting on December 30, 1978, Bob Weir of The Grateful Dead occasionally changed the lyrics of the Dead standard "Jack Straw" in concert from "we used to play for silver, now we play for life," to "we used to play for acid, now we play for Clive."

One of the last bands Davis tried to sign to Columbia Records was the proto-punk band Death. According to their documentary he was the only person who was interested in a black band doing rock music, but he asked them to change their name. They refused, as the name was a reflection of a personal event. The contract dissolved, and the band released their album on another label 35 years later.

Arista years 

After Davis was fired from CBS Records in 1973 for allegedly using company funds to bankroll his son's bar mitzvah, Columbia Pictures then hired him to be a consultant for the company's Bell Records label. Davis took time out to write his memoirs and then founded Arista Records in 1974. The company was named after New York City's secondary school honor society, of which Davis was a member.

At Arista, Davis signed Barry Manilow, followed by Aretha Franklin, Dionne Warwick, Patti Smith, Westlife, Al Jourgensen, The Outlaws, Eric Carmen, The Bay City Rollers, Exposé, Taylor Dayne, Ace of Base,  The Right Profile, Air Supply, Ray Parker Jr. and Raydio, and Alicia Keys, and he brought Carly Simon, Melissa Manchester, Grateful Dead, The Kinks, Jermaine Stewart, Gil Scott-Heron (on whose episode of TV One's Unsung Davis was interviewed) and Lou Reed to the label. He co-founded Arista Nashville in 1989 with Tim DuBois, which became the home to Alan Jackson, Brooks & Dunn, Pam Tillis, and Brad Paisley.

Davis founded LaFace Records with L.A. Reid and Babyface. LaFace subsequently became the home of TLC, Usher, Outkast, Pink and Toni Braxton. He founded Bad Boy Records with Sean "Puffy" Combs and it became the home of the Notorious B.I.G., Craig Mack, Combs, Mase, 112, and Faith Evans, although Davis would later admit that he never quite understood rap music. In 1998, Davis signed LFO from European Success. LFO charted #3 with "Summer Girls" in 1999, and went on to multiplatinum success.

During the Arista years, he set up his own production company Clive Davis Entertainment, for a two-year first-look agreement with movie studio Tri-Star Pictures in 1987.

Davis was made aware of Cissy Houston's daughter Whitney Houston after he saw the Houstons perform at a New York City nightclub. Impressed with what he heard, Davis signed her to Arista. Houston became one of the biggest selling artists in music history under the guidance of Davis at Arista.

J Records, RCA, Sony years 
Davis left Arista in 2000 and started J Records, an independent label with financial backing from Arista parent Bertelsmann Music Group, named with the middle initial of Davis and his four children. BMG would buy a majority stake in J Records in 2002, and Davis would become president and CEO of the larger RCA Music Group.

Davis' continued success in breaking new artists was recognised by the music industry A&R site HitQuarters when the executive was named "world's No.1 A&R of 2001" based on worldwide chart data for that year.

In 2004, BMG merged with Sony Music Entertainment to form Sony BMG. With the assets of the former CBS Records (renamed Sony Music Entertainment in 1991) now under Sony's ownership, the joint venture would mean a return of sorts for Davis to his former employer. Davis remained with RCA Label Group until 2008, when he was named chief creative officer for Sony BMG.

Davis was elevated to Chief Creative Officer of Sony Music Entertainment, a title he currently holds, as part of a corporate restructuring when Sony BMG became Sony Music Entertainment in late 2008 when BMG sold its shares to Sony. Arista Records and J Records, which were both founded by Davis, were dissolved in October 2011 through the restructuring of RCA Records. All artists under those labels were moved to RCA Records.

Awards and honors 
As a producer, Davis has won four Grammy Awards.

Davis also received the Grammy Trustees Award in 2000 and the President's Merit Award at the 2009 Grammys. In 2011, the 200-seat theater at the Grammy Museum was named the "Clive Davis Theater".

In 2000, Davis was inducted into the Rock and Roll Hall of Fame in the non-performers category.

In 2000, Davis received the Golden Plate Award of the American Academy of Achievement.

In 2015, he was recognized by Equality Forum as one of the 31 Icons of the LGBT History Month.

Davis was a 2018 Honoree at The New Jewish Home's Eight Over Eighty Gala.

An alumnus of New York University, Davis is a significant benefactor to it. The recorded music division of its Tisch School of the Arts, is named after him: the Clive Davis Institute of Recorded Music.

Davis was portrayed by Oscar nominated actor, Stanley Tucci, in Sony Pictures Whitney Houston: I Wanna Dance with Somebody – a biopic about the life and music of Whitney Houston. Davis also serves as a producer on the film.

Personal life 
Davis has been married and divorced twice. He was married to Helen Cohen from 1956 to 1965 and to Janet Adelberg from 1965 to 1985. He has four children: Fred (born 1960), a prominent media investment banker, Lauren (born 1962), an entertainment attorney and arts professor at New York University's Tisch School of the Arts, Mitchell (born 1970), and Doug Davis (born 1974), a  music executive and Grammy award-winning record producer. Davis has eight grandchildren.

In 2013, Davis publicly came out as bisexual in his autobiography The Soundtrack of My Life. On the daytime talk show Katie, he told host Katie Couric that he hoped his coming out would lead to "greater understanding" of bisexuality.

Further reading 
Davis, Clive (1975). Clive: Inside the Record Business, William Morrow & Company, Inc. 
Davis, Clive (2013). The Soundtrack of My Life, Simon & Schuster.

References

External links 

1932 births
Living people
A&R people
American chief executives
20th-century American Jews
American memoirists
American music industry executives
Arista Records
Bisexual men
Columbia Records
Erasmus Hall High School alumni
Grammy Award winners
Harvard Law School alumni
American LGBT businesspeople
LGBT Jews
LGBT memoirists
LGBT people from New York (state)
LGBT record producers
Record producers from New York (state)
New York University alumni
Sony Music
World Music Awards winners
21st-century American Jews